In Swiss politics and the history of the Old Swiss Confederacy, a  is the body of voting population in a certain valley (as it were English dale-ship).
The grouping of voters by valley rather than municipality is a tradition harking back to before the establishment of the current administrative divisions with the foundation of Switzerland as a federal state in 1848. A  will typically include voters of several municipalities.

Historically,  is the traditional German translation of the Latin term  in the Federal Charter of 1291, literally 'the people of the valley'. Thus, the enumeration of the Confederates,

is rendered as

References

See also
Reichsvogt
Waldstätte
Landvogtei (Switzerland)

Politics of Switzerland
Suffrage